Keith Inch (originally Keith Insche, Keithinche or Caikinche) is the easternmost point of mainland Scotland, having formerly been an island. It is now joined to Greenhill, another former island.

It forms part of Peterhead Harbour. Inch is a common Scottish word for an island, e.g.

It was used in the whaling industry, and boil yards were here; the remains of a whale bone arch can be seen.

Castle of Keith Inch

On the island of Keith Inch once stood a castle built by George Keith, 5th Earl Marischal, in the late 16th century. The castle is thought to have been modelled on the castle of Kronborg in Denmark. In 1644 about 500 of Cromwell's English soldiers rampaged in the Peterhead area. They were encamped on Keith Inch, with their headquarters in the castle.

After 1715, it was purchased by Thomas Arbuthnot, who built a mode modern house to the north of the island. When it was abandoned, it was converted into partly a fish-house and partly into boil yards. The final complete vestiges were removed in the late 19th century, although an occasional "massive" stone wall can be found.

See also

 Dunnet Head – Scotland's most northerly point on the mainland
 Mull of Galloway – Scotland's most southerly point
 Corrachadh Mòr – Scotland's most westerly point on the mainland

References
 Haswell-Smith, Hamish The Scottish Islands

External links 

Landforms of Peterhead
Headlands of Scotland
Former islands of Scotland